Lotte Vannieuwenborg (born 7 April 1987) is a Belgian actress. She is best known for her role as Katrien Snackaert in the Flemish soap Thuis. In 2010 she also had a guest role in the television series Goesting and in 2012 she guest starred in the Belgian television series Danni Lowinski.

Vannieuwenborg studied Drama at the Lemmensinstituut in Leuven, Belgium.

Filmography

Television

Shorts

External links
 

1987 births
Living people
Belgian film actresses
20th-century Belgian actresses
21st-century Belgian actresses
Belgian television actresses
Flemish film actresses
20th-century Flemish actresses
21st-century Flemish actresses
Flemish television actresses